The 2001 Porsche Tennis Grand Prix was a women's tennis tournament played on indoor hard courts at the Filderstadt Tennis Club in Filderstadt, Germany that was part of Tier II of the 2001 WTA Tour. It was the 24th edition of the tournament and was held from 8 October until 14 October 2001. Third-seeded Lindsay Davenport won the singles title and earned $90,000 first-prize money.

Finals

Singles
 Lindsay Davenport defeated  Justine Henin 7–5, 6–4
 It was Davenport's 5th singles title of the year and the 35th of her career.

Doubles
 Lindsay Davenport /  Lisa Raymond defeated  Justine Henin /  Meghann Shaughnessy 6–4, 6–7(4–7), 7–5

Prize money

References

External links
 ITF tournament edition details
 Tournament draws

Porsche Tennis Grand Prix
Porsche Tennis Grand Prix
2001 in German tennis
2000s in Baden-Württemberg
Porsch